Edward Kavanagh (April 27, 1795 – January 22, 1844) was a United States representative and the 17th Governor of Maine. Born in Newcastle (in modern-day Maine, then a part of Massachusetts) to Irish Catholic immigrants from County Wexford. He later attended Montreal Seminary (in Quebec, Canada) and Georgetown College in Washington. He graduated from St. Mary's College (Baltimore) in 1813.  He studied law, was admitted to the bar and commenced practice in Damariscotta, Maine. He was a member of the Maine House of Representatives from 1826 to 1828, and was secretary of the state senate in 1830.

Kavanagh's public career began with a plea to the framers of the Maine Constitution to include an article for official religious toleration.  His first elected role was on the school committee, followed by roles as selectman, state representative, and state senator.  In 1829 the legislature elected him as secretary of state.

Kavanagh was elected as a Jacksonian to the Twenty-second and Twenty-third Congresses, serving from March 4, 1831, to March 3, 1835.  He was nationally noticed as the first Catholic elected from New England. He was an unsuccessful candidate for reelection in 1834 to the Twenty-fourth Congress, and was appointed Chargé d'Affaires to Portugal on March 3, 1835, and served until his resignation in June 1841. He was one of the four Maine commissioners on the northeastern boundary in 1842 in the negotiations that led to the Webster-Ashburton Treaty, and was a member of the Maine Senate in 1842 and 1843 and served as the president of the Maine Senate.

Governor of Maine
Kavanagh became Governor of Maine upon the election of Governor Fairfield on March 7, 1843, to replace U.S. Senator Reuel Williams upon William's resignation, and served until the end of the term in 1844.  Less than four weeks later, Kavanagh died in Newcastle; interment was in St. Patrick's Catholic Cemetery, Damariscotta Mills.

Kavanagh's house in Newcastle has been listed on the National Register of Historic Places.

References

External links

Edward Kavanagh biography at National Governors Association

 

1795 births
1844 deaths
Ambassadors of the United States to Portugal
Democratic Party members of the Maine House of Representatives
19th-century American diplomats
Presidents of the Maine Senate
Democratic Party Maine state senators
Democratic Party governors of Maine
People from Damariscotta, Maine
St. Mary's Seminary and University alumni
Maine Democratic-Republicans
Jacksonian members of the United States House of Representatives from Maine
19th-century American politicians
People from Newcastle, Maine
Georgetown College (Georgetown University) alumni